XHOZ-FM is a radio station on 91.7 FM in Xalapa, Veracruz.

History
The concession for XEOZ-AM 960 was awarded to Luis Ignacio Santibañez Patiño on January 16, 1946, with the current concessionaire being created in 1983. In 1994, the station gained its FM counterpart and adopted the ACIR  contemporary hit music format. The station then transitioned to the  romantic music format in the early 2000s.

On October 27, 2022, the station's air staff announced their departure. Carlos Ferráez then took over operations on November 1, initially retaining the Amor name and branding used by ACIR. The change followed the sale or shutdown of five other ACIR stations across Veracruz during 2022.

Notes

References

Radio stations in Veracruz